Mary may refer to:

People

 Mary (name), a feminine given name (includes a list of people with the name)

Religious contexts
 New Testament people named Mary, overview article linking to many of those below
 Mary, mother of Jesus, also called the Blessed Virgin Mary
 Mary Magdalene, devoted follower of Jesus
 Mary of Bethany, follower of Jesus, considered by Western medieval tradition to be the same person as Mary Magdalene
 Mary, mother of James
 Mary of Clopas, follower of Jesus
 Mary, mother of John Mark
 Mary of Egypt, patron saint of penitents
 Mary of Rome, a New Testament woman
 Mary, mother of Zechariah and sister of Moses and Aaron; mostly known by the Hebrew name: Miriam
 Mary the Jewess one of the reputed founders of alchemy, referred to by Zosimus.
 Mary 2.0, Roman Catholic women's movement
 Maryam (surah) "Mary", 19th surah (chapter) of the Qur'an

Royalty
 Mary, Countess of Blois (1200–1241), daughter of Walter of Avesnes and Margaret of Blois
 Mary of Burgundy (1457–1482), daughter of Charles the Bold, Duke of Burgundy
 Mary, Crown Princess of Denmark (born 1972), wife of Crown Prince Frederik
 Mary I of England (1516–1558), aka "Bloody Mary", Queen of England and Ireland
 Mary II of England (1662–1694), Queen of England, Scotland, and Ireland
 Mary of Guelders (c. 1434–1463), daughter of Arnold, Duke of Guelders
 Mary of Guise (1515–1560), Queen Consort of James V of Scotland and mother of Mary, Queen of Scots
 Mary, Queen  of Hungary (1371–1395), daughter of Louis I the Great of Hungary
 Mary of Modena (1658–1718), Queen Consort of King James II of England and VII of Scotland
 Mary I of Portugal (1734–1816), daughter of King Joseph I of Portugal
 Mary II of Portugal (1819–1853), daughter of the future King Pedro IV
 Mary, Queen of Scots (1542–1587), mother of James I of England
 Mary of Teck (1867–1953), Queen Consort of George V of the United Kingdom
 Mary of Woodstock (1278–1332), daughter of Edward I of England

Others 
 A pseudonym for Communist Party USA activist Williana Burroughs (1882–1945), used in the 1920s
 Mary (conjoined twin) (2000–2000), pseudonym of Rosie Attard, subject of a 2001 legal case
 Mary (slave) (died 1838), an American teenage slave executed for murder
 Miriai (c. first century CE), a woman in Mandaeism

Places
 Mary Region, in southeast Turkmenistan
 Mary District, in Mary Province
 Mary, Turkmenistan, capital city of the province, located in Mary District
 Mary International Airport
 Mary, Saône-et-Loire, France
 Mary River (disambiguation)
 Mary's Point, New Brunswick, Canada

Arts and entertainment

Theater
 Mary (musical) (1920), by Otto Harbach and Frank Mandel with music by Louis Hirsch

Film
 Mary (1931 film), an Alfred Hitchcock film
 Mary (1994 film), an Australian documentary
 Mary (2005 film), a film directed by Abel Ferrara about an actress playing Mary Magdalene
 Mary (2019 film), an American horror film

Television
 Mary (1978 TV series), a variety series
 Mary (1985 TV series), a sitcom

Fictional characters
 Mary Poppins, fictional nanny with magical powers
 Mary, a character in Total Drama Presents: The Ridonculous Race, a Canadian animated series
 Mary, a character played by Drew Barrymore in the 2009 American romantic comedy-drama movie He's Just Not That Into You
 Mary Conner, a character in the American sitcom television series Roseanne
 Mary Hartman, the title character on the soap opera satire Mary Hartman, Mary Hartman
 Mary Jensen, the main character played by Cameron Diaz in the 1998 American romantic comedy movie There's Something About Mary
 Mary Melody, a character in the Tiny Toon Adventures animated television series
 Mary Test, the older twin sister of Susan Test in the American animated series Johnny Test
 Lady Mary Talbot (née Crawley), a character in Downton Abbey, played by Michelle Dockery

Music

Albums
 Mary (Mary J. Blige album), 1999
 Mary (Mary Travers album), 1971
 Mary (Sarkodie album), 2015

Songs
 "Mary", Russian-language art song by Alexander Egorovich Varlamov
 "Mary" (Monique Brumby song), a 1996 song from Thylacine
 Mary (Sarah Slean song), a track on the 2004 album Day One by Sarah Slean
 Mary (Scissor Sisters song), a 2004 song by American rock band Scissor Sisters
 Mary (Supergrass song), a 1999 song by British band Supergrass
 "Mary", a 2017 song by Big Thief on the album Capacity
 "Mary", a song by Kings of Leon on the album Come Around Sundown
 "Mary", a song by The 4 of Us on the album Songs for the Tempted
 "Mary", a song by Tori Amos on the album Tales of a Librarian
 "Mary", a song by John Cale from the album Shifty Adventures in Nookie Wood
 "Mary", a song by Oingo Boingo on Boingo
 "Mary", a song by Robert Fripp on Exposure
 "Mary", a song by Sarah McLachlan on the album Fumbling Towards Ecstasy
 "Mary", a song by Buffy Sainte-Marie on Illuminations
 "Mary", a song by Sublime on the album Robbin' the Hood
 "Mary", a song by The Subways on the album Young for Eternity
 "Mary", a song by Pete Townshend written for the concept album Lifehouse
 "Mary", a song by Dune Rats on The Kids Will Know It's Bullshit
 "Mary Is a Grand Old Name", a song by George M. Cohan from Forty-five Minutes from Broadway
 "Mary (I'm in Love with You)", a song written by J. Fred Coots and Ozzie Nelson
 "Mary", a song by Alex G on "Trick"

Novels
 Mary, by Vladimir Nabokov
 Mary: A Fiction, a 1788 novel by Mary Wollstonecraft

Ships and boats

 Mary (HBC vessel), operated by the HBC from 1737–1749, see Hudson's Bay Company vessels
 , the proposed naval name and designation for a motorboat that was never acquired

Other uses
 Mary (crater), a lunar impact crater
 Mary (elephant), an elephant from the Sparks World Famous Shows circus
 Mary (programming language)
 Mary 2.0, Roman Catholic women's movement

See also

 
 
 Islas Marías (Mary Islands), Mexico
 Mari (disambiguation)
 Maria (disambiguation)
 Marie (disambiguation)
 Marius (disambiguation)
 Maryam (surah) "Mary", 19th surah (chapter) of the Qur'an
 Mery (disambiguation)
 Miss Mary (disambiguation)